AKL may refer to:
 Alpha Kappa Lambda, US collegiate fraternity
Auckland Airport, New Zealand (IATA code AKL)
 Air Kiribati's ICAO code
 Small cargo ships per list of auxiliaries of the United States Navy
 Dry cargo support ships in the list of active Indonesian Navy ships